The Unrepentant Geraldines Tour was a concert tour by American singer-songwriter, Tori Amos, to support her fourteenth studio album, Unrepentant Geraldines. The tour featured Amos in solo concert playing in Europe, South Africa, North America and Australia.

Tour dates

References

2014 concert tours
Tori Amos concert tours